QCY may refer to:

RAF Coningsby, airfield in England, IATA code QCY
Quincy station (Amtrak), rail station in United States, station code QCY
QCY, a Q code used in radio communication